Thomas Herbert Maguire (1821 – 1895) was an English artist and engraver, noted for his portraits of prominent figures.

Maguire was a brilliant pupil of master lithographer and line-engraver, Richard James Lane (1800-1872), one of the favourite collaborators of the Swiss portrait painter, Alfred Edward Chalon in the pages of the Illustrated London News.
 
The series of 60 scientific portraits by Maguire was privately commissioned by George Ransome, FLS, of Ipswich, in connection with the foundation of the Ipswich Museum. They were executed cumulatively between 1847 and 1852, as the Museum obtained fresh scientific sponsors. Some were made by the artist from life, and others from photographic portraits or (in the case of the Revd William Kirby) from an oil portrait. The exact total of this series is slightly above 60 because some (e.g. Edwin Lankester) were re-drawn. Copies of the lithographs were given to subscribing members of the Museum, and a bound portfolio copy of the series was presented by Professor J.S. Henslow to Prince Albert when he inspected the Museum on the occasion of the 1851 Ipswich Congress of the British Association for the Advancement of Science. George Ransome resigned his position as founding Secretary of the Museum in 1852 and the cumulative series was then discontinued. His drawing of William John Burchell dated 1854 was engraved by M. & N. Hanhart.

The complete name list is: His Royal Highness Prince Albert, 
George Biddell Airy, 
George Allman, 
David Thomas Ansted, 
Robert Ball, 
Sir Henry T. de la Beche, 
Thomas Bell, 
Sir John Boileau, 
Charles Lucien Bonaparte, 
James Scott Bowerbank, 
The Marquis of Bristol, 
Robert Brown, 
Very Rev. William Buckland, 
William Carpenter, 
Sir William Cubitt, 
John Curtis, 
Edward Doubleday, 
Charles Darwin, 
Michael Faraday, 
Edward Forbes, 
Edward Forster, 
John Gould, 
Robert Edmond Grant, 
John Edward Gray, 
William Henry Harvey, 
Rev. J.S. Henslow, 
Rev. Dr. Hinds, Bishop of Norwich, 
Sir William Jackson Hooker, 
Joseph Dalton Hooker, 
Sir William Jardine, 
Rev. William Kirby, 
General Sir Edward Kerrison, 
Edwin Lankester, 
John Lee, 
John Lindley, 
Sir Charles Lyell, 
David William Mitchell, 
Sir Roderick Impey Murchison, 
Richard Owen, 
Robert Patterson, 
John Phillips, 
Lyon Playfair, 
James Ransome, 
Lovell Reeve, 
Rev. Stephen J. Rigaud, 
Right Hon. Lord Rendlesham, 
Sir James Clarke Ross, 
Lieutenant-Colonel Edward Sabine, 
Rev. Adam Sedgwick, 
Prideaux John Selby, 
Rev. Edwin Sidney, 
William Spence, 
Rev. Dr. Stanley, 
Richard Taylor, 
William Thompson, 
Nathaniel Wallich, 
George R. Waterhouse, 
John O. Westwood, 
William Yarrell, 
T.B. Western.

References

External links
Works by Thomas Herbert Maguire at the National Portrait Gallery

English engravers
1821 births
1895 deaths